The history of French airborne units began in the Interwar period when the French Armed Forces formed specialized paratroopers units.  First formed in the French Air Force, they were rapidly integrated into the French Army, French Navy, National Gendarmerie and from the British Armed Forces. Some were later included in the postwar French Armed Forces.

French Army

Parachute and airborne divisions 
 24th Airborne Division (24e DAP, 25th Motorized Infantry Division 25e DIM, then 25th Airborne Division 25e DAP).
 25th Airborne Division (25th Motorised Infantry Division 25e DIM; then, 25th Airborne Division 25e DAP dissolved).
 25th Parachute Division (25th Parachute Division 25e DP, dissolved).
 10th Parachute Division (10th Parachute Division 10e DP, dissolved).
 11th Light Intervention Division (11th Light Intervention Division 11e DLI formed from 10th Parachute Division 10e DP and 25th Parachute Division 25e DP).
 11th Division (11th Division 11e DIV formed from merger of 11th Light Intervention Division 11e DLI and 9e Brigade 9e BDE).
 11th Parachute Division (11th Division 11e DIV, then 11th Parachute Division 11e DP).
 11th Parachute Brigade (11th Parachute Division 11eDP, then 11th Parachute Brigade 11e BP).

Parachute Brigades and Groups 

 The 11th Parachute Brigade (11e B.P) of the French Army includes:
Commando Parachute Group (G.C.P Teams)
 1st Parachute Chasseur Regiment, (1er RCP) (G.C.P commando Teams).
 1st Parachute Hussar Regiment, (1er RHP) (G.C.P Teams).
 1st Train Parachute Regiment (1er RTP). 
 2nd Foreign Parachute Regiment, (2e REP) (G.C.P Teams).
 3rd Marine Infantry Parachute Regiment, (3e RPIMa) (G.C.P Teams).
 8th Marine Infantry Parachute Regiment, (8e RPIMa) (G.C.P Teams).
 17th Parachute Engineer Regiment, (7e RGP) (G.C.P Teams).
 35th Parachute Artillery Regiment, (35e RAP) (G.C.P Teams). 
 Airborne Groupment, GAP.

Parachute Demi-Brigades 

  SAS Parachute Demi-Brigade (D-B.P-SAS, later 1er RPIMa).
  Colonial Parachute Commando Demi-Brigade (D-B.CCP, later 1er RPIMa).
 1st Colonial Parachute Commando Demi-Brigade (1re DBCCP, later 1er RPIMa).
 2nd Colonial Parachute Commando Demi-Brigade (2e DBCCP, later 1er RPIMa).
 Parachute Marching Demi-Brigade (DBMP - dissolved).
 11th Parachute Choc Demi-Brigade (11e Demi-Brigade Parachutiste de Choc) (11e D-B.PC - dissolved).

Parachute centers of formation and schools 
  ) (BETAP), Base School of Airborne Troops .
 School of Airborne Troops (ETAP).
 School Brigade of Colonial Paratroopers.
 National Parachute Instruction Center (NPIC) Orléans (Dissolved).

Foreign Legion

Legion parachute companies, battalions and regiments 
 Parachute Company of the 3rd Foreign Infantry Regiment (C.P. du 3e R.E.I. attached to the IIIe/1er R.C.P - dissolved then 1er B.E.P).
 Foreign Air Supply Company (CERA - dissolved).
 1st Foreign Parachute Heavy Mortar Company (1re C.E.P de M.L]] - dissolved).
 1st Foreign Parachute Battalion (1e BEP, III Formations; then, 1er R.E.P - dissolved).
 1st Foreign Parachute Regiment  (1e REP - dissolved).
 3rd Foreign Parachute Battalion (3e B.E.P, IV Formations with 1er B.E.P and 2e B.E.P; then, 3e R.E.P - dissolved).
 3rd Foreign Parachute Regiment (3e R.E.P - dissolved, merged with 2e B.E.P, then 2e R.E.P).
 2nd Foreign Parachute Battalion (2e B.E.P, V Formations with 3e B.E.P then 2e R.E.P - dissolved).
 2nd Foreign Parachute Regiment, 2e R.E.P, (Commando Parachute Group Teams)

Parachute (Airborne) Commandos of the Foreign Legion 

Parachute Commandos of the 11th Parachute Brigade (11e BP) include:

 2nd Foreign Parachute Regiment (2e REP) 
 GCP Teams (Commando Parachute Group), these Airborne Commandos are elite operational pathfinder units specializing in Reconnaissance and Deep Action.

Parachute, Underwater Demolition and Diving Units of the 6th Light Armoured Brigade include:

 1st Foreign Engineer Regiment (1er REG)
 PCG Teams (Combat Engineer Divers), former DINOPS Teams of Nautical Subaquatic Intervention Operational Detachment specialized in Parachute, Underwater Demolition and Diving.

Parachute, Underwater Demolition, Diving Units and Commandos of the 27th Mountain Infantry Brigade (27e MIB) include:

 2nd Foreign Engineer Regiment (2e REG)
 PCG Teams (Combat Engineer Divers), former DINOPS Teams of Nautical Subaquatic Intervention Operational Detachment specialized in Parachute, Underwater Demolition and Diving.
 Mountain Commando Groups (GCM)

Troupes de Marine

Marine Infantry Parachute Regiments 

 1st Marine Infantry Parachute Regiment (1re CIA, 1re CP, PPL, 1re CCP, French SAS, 1er BIA, 4e BIA, 2e RCP or 4th French SAS, 1er BC.SAS, 1er BP.SAS, 2e BP.SAS, 1er BPARA.SAS, 1er BCCP, 1er GCCP, 1er BPC, 1re D-B.P.SAS, D-B.CCP, D-B.CCP.SAS, 1re DBCCP, 2e DBCCP, B.P.Colonial BPC, BEPC, BP-OM, B.P.I.Ma, then 1er R.P.I.Ma part of COS).
 2nd Marine Infantry Parachute Regiment (2e BCCP, 2e B.P.Colonial 2e BPC, 2nd Colonial Parachute Regiment 2e RPC, then 2e RPIMa).
 3rd Marine Infantry Parachute Regiment (3e BCCP, 3e GCCP, 3e BCCP, 3e B.P.Colonial 3e BPC, 3rd Colonial Parachute Regiment 3e RPC, then 3e RPIMa), (Commando Parachute Group Teams).
 ( (5e BPIC, 5e BCCP, 5eBPC, 5e BPIMa - dissolved).
 6th Marine Infantry Parachute Regiment (6e BCCP, 6e GCCP, 6eB.P.Colonial 6e BPC, 6th Colonial Parachute Regiment 6e RPC, then 6e RPIMa - dissolved).
  ) (7e BCCP, 7eGCCP, 7e BCCP, 7e BPC, 4eBCCP, 7th Colonial Parachute Regiment 7e RPC, 7e RPIMa, then 7e RPCS - dissolved).
 8th Marine Infantry Parachute Regiment (8e B.P.Colonial 8e BPC, 8e GCP, 8e B.P.Choc 8e BPC, 8th Colonial Parachute Regiment 8e RPC, then 8e RPIMa), (Commando Parachute Group Teams).

Battalions and Colonial Parachute Groups 
 1st Colonial Parachute Commando Battalion (1e BCCP, 1e GCCP, 1e BPC, then B.P.C.).
 2nd Colonial Parachute Commando Battalion (2e BCCP, 2e GCCP, 2e BPC, then 2e RPC).
 3rd Colonial Parachute Commando Battalion (3e BCCP, 3e BPC, then 3e RPC, 3e RPIMa).
 4th Colonial Parachute Commando Battalion (4e BCCP - dissolved).
 5th Colonial Parachute Infantry Battalion (5e BPIC - dissolved).
 5th Colonial Parachute Commando Battalion (5e BCCP then 5e BPC - dissolved).
 6th Colonial Parachute Commando Battalion (6e régiment parachutiste d'infanterie de marine) (6e BCCP, 6e GCCP then 6e BPC, then 6e R.P.C - 6e R.P.I.Ma).
 7th Colonial Parachute Commando Battalion (7e BCCP, 7e GCCP then 7e BPC - dissolved).
 8th Colonial Parachute Battalion (8e Bataillon de Parachutistes Coloniaux) (8e BPC, then 8e R.P.C - 8e R.P.I.Ma).
 10th Colonial Parachute Battalion (10e BPC).
 Colonial Group Parachute Commando of Madagascar (GCCP Madagascar - dissolved).
 Colonial Group of Parachute Commandos of Afrique équatoriale française AEF (GCCP AEF - dissolved).
 Marine Infantry Parachute Company (CPIMA and 6e CPIMa - dissolved).

Parachute Artillery 

 5th Airborne Artillery Campaign Regiment (20e RAP, 5e RAP, 5e RACAP - dissolved).
 6th Light Parachute Artillery Regiment (6e RALP - dissolved).
 20th Light Parachute Artillery Regiment (20e RALP - dissolved; then, 20th Parachute Group Artillery, 20e GAP - dissolved).
 35th Parachute Artillery Regiment (35e R.A, 35e RALP, then 35e RAP), (Commando Parachute Group Teams).

Parachute Cavalry 

 1st Parachute Hussar Regiment (1er RHP), (Commando Parachute Group Teams).
 13th Parachute Dragoon Regiment (13e RDP).

Parachute Engineer 
 17th Parachute Engineer Battalion (17e BGAP - dissolved).
 61st and 71st Parachute Engineer Battalions of the Far East (Extrême-Orient) (61e BG and 71e BG - dissolved).
 60th, 61st and 75th Parachute Engineer Companies (60e CGAP, 61e CGAP, 75e CGAP - dissolved).
 17th Parachute Engineer Regiment (17e RGAP, then 17e RGP), (Commando Parachute Group Teams).

Parachute Infantry

Patrol Chasseurs 
  (5e BCAP, 5th Patrol Chasseur Battalion  - dissolved).
 ) (10e BPCP, 10th Patrol Chasseur Battalion - dissolved).

General Parachute Infantry 

 (18e RIPC, "18th Parachute Infantry Regiment" - dissolved).
 (21e RIAP, " 21st Parachute Infantry Regiment " - dissolved).

French Air Force Commando de l'Air, Parachute Chasseur, British Army Special Air Service (S.A.S) & 1er R.P.I.Ma 

 1st Parachute Chasseur Regiment / 1st Air Infantry Battalion (601e G.I.A, 602e G.I.A, 1re C.I.A, 1er BCP, then 1er RCP), ( Commando Parachute Group Teams).
 2nd Parachute Chasseur Regiment/4th Air Infantry Battalion (4e BIA, 2e RCP SAS, then 1er RPIMa French); also known as 4th Special Air Service of British Army and assigned to Special Air Service Troops).
 3rd Parachute Chasseur Regiment /3rd Air Infantry Battalion (3e BIA, 3e RCP, 2e RCP SAS, then 1er RPIMa French); also known as 3rd Special Air Service of British Army and was assigned to Special Air Service Troops).
 4th Parachute Chasseur Regiment, (4e RCP - dissolved).
 5th Parachute Chasseur Regiment, (5e RCP - dissolved).
 9th Parachute Chasseur Regiment, (9e RCP, merged with 1er RCP).
   ('14th Parachute Chasseur Regiment' (14e RCP - dissolved).
  ("18th Parachute Chasseur Regiment")  (18e RCP - dissolved).

Shock Paratroopers 

 1st Shock Battalion (1er BC - dissolved).
 2nd Shock Battalion/ Bataillon Janson-de-Sailly or Bataillon Gayardon  (2e BC - dissolved).
 3rd Shock Battalion / Commando Group of France   (3e BC - dissolved).
 4th Shock Battalion /   (4e BC - dissolved).
 5th Shock Battalion /   (5e BC - dissolved).
 6th Shock Battalion /   (6e BC - dissolved).
 1st Parachute Shock Battalion  (1er BPC - dissolved).
 2nd Parachute Shock Battalion  (2e BPC - dissolved).
 1st Shock Parachute Infantry Regiment 1er régiment d'infanterie de choc aéroporté(1er RICAP - dissolved).
 11th Shock Parachute Regiment 11e régiment parachutiste de choc (11e BPC, 11e DBPC and 11e RPC - dissolved).
 12th Shock Parachute Battalion  (12e BPC - dissolved).
 Mixed Airborne Commando Groupment  (G.C.M.A - dissolved).

French Train Parachute Regiments

Parachute Companies and Regiments 
 Air Support Companies  (CRA).
 Air Delivery Regiment (RLA - dissolved).
 1st Train Parachute Regiment (1er RTP).

Airborne Bases 
 Northern Airborne Base (B.AP.N - dissolved).
 Southern Airborne Base (B.AP.S - dissolved).
 North African Airborne Base (B.AP/AF.N - dissolved).
 Airborne Operational Mobile Base (B.O.M.AP).

Parachute Command and Support 
 14th Parachute Logistic and Support Regiment (14e RISLP) - former 14th Parachute Command and Support Regiment.
 7th Parachute Command and Support Regiment (7e RPCS - dissolved).

Matériel 
 3rd Matériel Regiment (3e RMAT).

Vietnamese, Laotien and Cambodian Parachute Units 

 1st Vietnamese Parachute Battalion (1er BPVN - dissolved).
 3rd Vietnamese Parachute Battalion (3e BPVN - dissolved).
 5th Vietnamese Parachute Battalion (5e BPVN - dissolved).
 6th Vietnamese Parachute Battalion (dissolved).
 7th Vietnamese Parachute Battalion (dissolved).
 1st Khmers Parachute Battalion (created on December 1, 1952 in Cambodia).
 1st Laotian Parachute Battalion (created on October 1, 1951 in Vientiane, Laos).

Algerian Parachute Units 
 19th Algerian Parachute Battalion
 14th Algerian Parachute Tirailleur Brigade

French Air and Space Force Fusiliers Commandos de l'Air 

Past and present Fusiliers Commandos de l'Air units have included:
 601st Airborne Infantry Group (601e G.I.A, 1e CIA, 1e BCP, then 1st Parachute Chasseur Regiment (1e RCP)).
 602nd Airborne Infantry Group (602e G.I.A, 1e CIA, 1e BCP, then 1e RCP).
 Air Marching Infantry Company (CIAM), 1e RCP.
 1st Air Infantry Company (1er CIA, 1er BCP, then 1er RCP).
1st Parachute Chasseur Regiment (1er RCP of the French Air Force transferred to the French Army).
 Air Force Security and Intervention Forces Brigade (France)
 Air Parachute Commando n° 10, C.P.A. 10, part of Special Operations Command (France) (COS).
 Air Parachute Commando n° 20, C.P.A. 20
 Air Parachute Commando n° 30, C.P.A. 30
 Protection Squadrons.

French Navy 

Naval Fusiliers and Commandos include the following Forces Fusiliers Marins and Commandos Marine FORFUSCO

 Aeronautical Naval Parachute Commando (dissolved).
 Commando Ponchardier (SAS B).
 Commando Hubert  (part of Special Operations Command (COS).
 Fusiliers Marins Commandos Group (GROUFUMACO - dissolved).
 Commando François (dissolved).
 Commando de Penfentenyo (part of COS).
 Commando Jaubert (part of COS).
 Commando de Montfort (part of COS).
 Commando Trépel (part of COS).
 Naval Fusiliers Instruction Center. École des fusiliers marins (ECOFUS) 
 Naval Fusiliers and Commando Base (BASEFUSCO).
 Commando Kieffer (part of COS).

National Gendarmerie 

Paratroopers of the National Gendarmerie include:

 National Gendarmerie Parachute Intervention Squadron (EPIGN), part of the National Gendarmerie Intervention Group, the GIGN.

Medics 

Combat medics in the French Armed Forces are part of the French Defence Health Service. Each French regiment, battalion, company and unit has its own specialized combat medics, with ranks designating various unit level sizes.

For French Regiments engaged in combat, the leading Medical leadership would be a colonel or Lieutenant-colonel and can also be designated as Parachute Medical-Colonel of the Army.

For Foreign Legion Regiments, Medics can be French and Legionnaires, while the leading Medical leadership would be a Colonel or Lieutenant-colonel and can also be designated as Foreign Parachute Medical-Colonel.

See also 

Special Operations Command (French: Commandement des Opérations Spéciales (COS)) 
Direction générale de la Gendarmerie Nationale (French: Direction Générale de la Gendarmerie nationale (DGGN)) in liaison
Parachutist badge
School of Airborne Troops (France)
 List of paratrooper forces

References

Bibliography 
 E. Micheletti et J. Baltzer, Insignes et brevets parachutistes de l'armée française, éditions Histoires et Collections, 2001, .
 Collectif, Histoire des parachutistes français (History of French Paratroopers), Société de Production Littéraire, 1975.

External links 
History of the 1st Parachute Chasseur Regiment, 9th Parachute Chasseur Regiment, 14th Parachute Chasseur Regiment and 18th Parachute Chasseur Regiment

.
French
Military parachuting in France
Paratroopers